Stadio Guido Biondi is a multi-use stadium in Lanciano, Italy.  It is currently used mostly for football matches and is the home ground of S.S. Virtus Lanciano 1924.  The stadium holds 5,334; about 976 seats are covered.

After the promotion of Virtus Lanciano, it was renovated to meet Serie B standards.

Guido Biondi
S.S. Virtus Lanciano 1924